José Wenceslao Díaz Zárate (born April 4, 1987) is a former Mexican professional footballer who last played for U. de G. of Ascenso MX.  He played every minute of the 2014 Apertura tournament.

References

External links

1987 births
Living people
People from Xalapa
Footballers from Veracruz
Mexican footballers
Leones Negros UdeG footballers
Liga MX players

Association footballers not categorized by position